The Allianz Golf Open Toulouse Metropole was an annual golf tournament held near Toulouse, France. It was founded in 2000 and became part of the Alps Tour schedule the following year. From 2003 to 2012, it was an event on the Challenge Tour.

Winners

Notes

External links

Coverage on the Challenge Tour's official site

Former Challenge Tour events
Defunct golf tournaments in France